An election for Mayor of Indianapolis was held on November 5, 2019. Joe Hogsett, the incumbent mayor, sought and won reelection for a second term in office.

Nominations

Democratic Primary

Candidates

Declared
 Denise Paul Hatch
 Joe Hogsett, incumbent Mayor of Indianapolis

Results

Republican Primary

Candidates

Declared
 Jim Merritt, chair of the Marion County Republican Party and State Senator
 Christopher James Moore, dump truck driver
 Felipe Rios

Withdrawn candidates
 Jose Evans, former member of Indianapolis City-County Council and former Democrat
 John Schmitz, real estate developer

Potential candidates that did not run
Greg Ballard, former mayor of Indianapolis
Jeff Cardwell, former chair of the Indiana Republican Party and former member of Indianapolis City-County Council
Ted Feeney, former president of Butler-Tarkington Neighborhood Association
 Cindy Kirchhofer, state representative
 Jamal Smith, executive director of the Indiana Civil Rights Commission

Results

Libertarian candidates
Douglas McNaughton

Independent candidates
John Schmitz, masonry contractor (failed to make ballot)

General election

''’

References

2019 United States mayoral elections
2019
2019 Indiana elections